Justice Stafford or Judge Stafford or variation, may refer to:

Charles F. Stafford (1918–1984), associate justice of the Washington Supreme Court
Wendell Phillips Stafford (1861–1953), associate justice of the Vermont Supreme Court
William Henry Stafford Jr. (born 1931), Senior United States District Judge of the United States District Court for the Northern District of Florida

See also

Sidney Stafford Smythe (1705–1778), British judge and politician
 Judge (disambiguation)
 Justice (disambiguation)
 Stafford (disambiguation)